The 2022 Nalley Cars 250 was the fifth stock car race of the 2022 NASCAR Xfinity Series and the 31st iteration of the event. The race was held on Saturday, March 19, 2022, in Hampton, Georgia at Atlanta Motor Speedway, a  permanent quad-oval racetrack. The race was run over 172 laps due to several overtime finishes. Ty Gibbs of Joe Gibbs Racing would win the race after taking the lead on the final lap. This was Gibbs' sixth career Xfinity Series win, and his second of the season. To fill out the podium, Austin Hill of Richard Childress Racing and A. J. Allmendinger of Kaulig Racing would finish 2nd and 3rd, respectably.

Background 
Atlanta Motor Speedway (formerly Atlanta International Raceway) is a 1.54-mile race track in Hampton, Georgia, United States, 20 miles (32 km) south of Atlanta. It has annually hosted NASCAR Cup Series stock car races since its inauguration in 1960.

The venue was bought by Speedway Motorsports in 1990. In 1994, 46 condominiums were built over the northeastern side of the track. In 1997, to standardize the track with Speedway Motorsports' other two intermediate ovals, the entire track was almost completely rebuilt. The project made the track one of the fastest on the NASCAR circuit. In July 2021 NASCAR announced that the track would be reprofiled for the 2022 season to have 28 degrees of banking and would be narrowed from 55 to 40 feet which the track claims will turn racing at the track similar to restrictor plate superspeedways. Despite the reprofiling being criticized by drivers, construction began in August 2021 and wrapped up in December 2021. The track has seating capacity of 71,000 to 125,000 people depending on the tracks configuration.

Entry list

Practice 
Friday's 50-minute practice session was cancelled due to inclement weather. Practice will replace qualifying on Saturday.

Qualifying 
Qualifying will be cancelled because of a need to add additional practice to the reconfigured circuit. Starling lineup will be  based on of the NASCAR rulebook. Noah Gragson would get the pole for the race.

Race results 
Stage 1 Laps: 40

Stage 2 Laps: 40

Stage 3 Laps: 83

Standings after the race 

Drivers' Championship standings

Note: Only the first 12 positions are included for the driver standings.

References 

2022 NASCAR Xfinity Series
NASCAR races at Atlanta Motor Speedway
Nalley Cars 250
Nalley Cars 250